Zinoviev, Zinovyev, Zinovieff, or Zinovieva (feminine; Зино́вьева), as a Russian surname, derives from the personal name Zinovi, from Greek Zenobios.
Notable people with the surname include:

 Alexander Dmitrievich Zinoviev (1854–1931), Russian politician (Governor of St Petersburg) under Nicholas II
 Alexander Zinoviev (1922–2006), Russian logician, sociologist, writer, and satirist
 Aleksandr Zinovyev (footballer) (born 1979), Russian footballer
 Grigory Zinoviev (1883–1936), Bolshevik revolutionary and Soviet politician
 Ivan Zinoviev (1905–1942), NKVD captain and Hero of the Soviet Union
 Peter Zinovieff (1933–2021), British inventor
 Lydia Zinovieva-Annibal (1866–1907), a Russian writer
 Sauli Zinovjev (b. 1988), Finnish composer
 Sergei Zinovjev, Russian ice hockey player
 Sofka Zinovieff (b. 1961), a British journalist and author
 Nikolai Zinoviev, fictional character from the video game Resident Evil 3: Nemesis

See also 
 Zinoviev letter, a faked letter in 1924 British politics
 Russian destroyer Azard (1916), later renamed Zinoviev

References 

Russian-language surnames